And That's Why We Drink (ATWWD) is a comedy true crime and paranormal podcast created by Christine Schiefer and Em Schulz.

The show has been in production since February 2017. It updates every Sunday on a variety of podcast platforms as well as a YouTube channel where video recordings of the podcast's audio recording sessions have been uploaded since October 2019. Since its launch, the show has seen over eighty million downloads and has spawned two live tours through the United States and Canada.

In May 2019, and again in 2021, the podcast won People's Voice for Best Comedy Podcast at the 23rd and 25th Annual Webby Awards.

In March of 2022, Schiefer and Schultz launched a second podcast, Rituals, produced by the Parcast podcasting network and streaming only on Spotify, which focuses on aspects of the occult, mystical and new age beliefs. 

In late May of 2022, Schiefer and Schulz published their first book, A Haunted Road Atlas, which debuted at #6 on the New York Times Best Sellers list for Advice, How-To and Miscellaneous works.

Format and production 
The podcast is formatted into two sections. The first is the paranormal section, in which Schulz discusses a paranormal story, often dealing with suspected haunted locations, alien or UFO sightings, cryptids, and occasionally conspiracy theories or creepypastas. This is followed by Schiefer's true crime portion of the show in which she covers murders, serial killers, unsolved crimes, and abductions. The two friends, both Boston University graduates, often tell stories about their lives as well, occasionally adding personal anecdotes to the stories.

The original name of the show was "Eerie and Theory", but was changed later in the conception phase to "And That's Why We Drink", after it was jokingly exclaimed during a moment of exasperation.

Originally, the two hosts also divided themselves into "Team Wine" and "Team Milkshake," as Schiefer often imbibes alcoholic drinks during the recording sessions, while Schulz, a teetotaler, would drink a variety of milkshakes, and the two would list the reasons (both good and bad) they were drinking that episode. While this is still a way for the hosts to identify their respective fan bases (more recently including a Team Lemon), in later episodes of the show, the practice of  drinking milkshakes was mostly abandoned.

On the first day of every month, the show features a special episode of "Listener Stories", in which the hosts read and react to stories of crimes and the paranormal submitted by fans, often with a theme requested by one of the hosts.

ATWWD occasionally features special guests, including the hosts' family and friends as well as comedian Lisa Lampanelli, who is Schiefer's aunt-in-law, and the podcast has done several crossover episodes with podcasts such as Wine and Crime, Morbid, and Sinisterhood, among others.

In October 2021, Schiefer took maternity leave after giving birth to her first child. During that time, Schulz continued to host the show along with a series of guest hosts, including Eva Gross and Schulz' girlfriend, Allison Goforth. Schiefer returned to the show in mid-February 2022.

Episodes

Regular show episodes

Listener stories volumes

Key 
* Special Guest Deirdre Klima

** Special Guest Lisa Lampanelli

*** For this episode, Schulz and Schiefer switched roles, with Schulz telling a crime story and Schiefer telling a paranormal one.

**** Special Guest Alexander Schiefer

***** First episode to be video-recorded and uploaded to YouTube.

****** Special Guest Allison Goforth

Notable Episodes 
On episode 289 (Jewish Deli Chocolate Milk and Microsoft PowerPoint Dissolve Ghosts) Christine tells her real life story of seeing a hotel ghost in Knoxville, TN.

On episode 302 (An Elbow Eyebrow and an Asaparagus Salad) Christine recounts how she felt a presence touch her arm during a touching moment in her house on Halloween.

References

External links

Comedy and humor podcasts
Crime podcasts
2017 podcast debuts
American podcasts